San Gorgonio Mountain, also known locally as Mount San Gorgonio, or Old Greyback, is the highest peak in Southern California and the Transverse Ranges at .

It lies within the San Gorgonio Wilderness, part of the Sand to Snow National Monument managed by the San Bernardino National Forest.

Spanish missionaries in the area during the early 17th century named the peak after Saint Gorgonius.

Since it is the highest point in a region which is separated from higher peaks (e.g. in the Sierra Nevada) by relatively low terrain, San Gorgonio Mountain is one of the most topographically prominent peaks in the United States. It is ranked 7th among peaks in the 48 contiguous states and 18th overall.

Like other high peaks in the Transverse Ranges, the mountain has a pyramid shape, with a steep north face and a slightly shallower south face. The mountain is large and broad; the summit plateau itself is one square-mile in area (2 km2).

In contrast to its spectacular but lower neighbor, San Jacinto Peak, San Gorgonio is not particularly craggy, and from a distance, it appears to be an extremely high hill, earning it the name of greyback. Despite not being particularly striking in appearance during the summer, it is the only mountain in Southern California with a summit a significant distance above the tree line. As such its bright white winter snow cap, unobstructed by vegetation, makes the mountain noticeable from many miles away.

Geography

San Gorgonio Mountain lies at the easternmost extremity of the Transverse Ranges. The mountain is a heavily eroded, partially dissected plateau.

Big Bear Lake, California is the largest city near San Gorgonio, and hosts two major ski resorts; it is also used for summer recreation.

Geology
The shape of the mountain is influenced by a series of steeply dipping thrust faults on the north face of the mountain. The south side of the mountain contains river canyons typical of a dissected plateau.

The mountain consists of a massive block of quartz monzonite, which sits on an ancient platform of Precambrian gneissic rocks. Glacial and fluvial deposits dominate the surface of the lowest part of the mountain.

Hydrology
Three major Southern California rivers have their source on San Gorgonio Mountain: the Santa Ana River, the Whitewater River, and the San Gorgonio River.

Jenks Lake, on the north slope of the mountain, is one of the few perennial lakes in Southern California.

San Gorgonio Mountain sits on the Great Basin Divide, which separates streams that flow into the basins of the Basin and Range Province from rivers that flow into the Pacific Ocean.

Climate
The climate on most of the mountain is Csb (Warm-summer Mediterranean) under the Köppen climate classification.

Hiking
Like most other peaks in the Transverse Ranges, the summit is a technically easy "class 1" hike. Several trails lead to the broad summit of San Gorgonio Mountain, which rises a few hundred feet (100 m) above the tree line.

Some junctions on this trail are not well marked.

Aircraft wreckage
On December 1, 1952, a Douglas C-47, serial number 45-1124, crashed at the  level on the eastern face of the mountain. The C-47 was en route from Offutt Air Force Base, Nebraska to March Air Force Base near Riverside, California when it struck the mountain at night in the middle of a storm. "The aircraft was last heard from at 9:51 p.m. Pacific Standard Time, Monday." Thirteen people died.

Nearly one month after the C-47 accident a Marine Corps HRS-2 helicopter, bureau number 129037, crashed on the mountain in coordination of the efforts of recovering the victims. The three crewmen of the helicopter survived the impact. The remains of the wreckage of the two aircraft were left on the mountain and are accessible via the Fish Creek Trailhead or the South Fork Trailhead.

In more recent years, the mountain claimed the lives of Frank Sinatra's mother, Dolly (January 6, 1977) and Dean Paul Martin (March 21, 1987), son of Dean Martin, in unrelated plane crashes. Martin was an Air National Guard pilot; the McDonnell Douglas F-4C he was flying disappeared in a snowstorm and the wreckage was found on the mountain several days later.

See also
 List of highest points in California by county
 List of Ultras of the United States

References

External links

 
 
 OnTheTrail.org - San Gorgonio Topo and Trail Map

San Bernardino Mountains
Mountains of San Bernardino County, California
Sand to Snow National Monument
San Bernardino National Forest
North American 3000 m summits
Mountains of Southern California
San Gorgonio Pass